Rupert Francis Young (born 16 May 1978) is an English actor from Lambeth, London. He portrayed Sir Leon in the BBC drama series Merlin. Young's television work includes episodes of Doc Martin, Foyle's War, Hotel Babylon, The White Queen, Doctor Who and other work. His films include Dirty Filthy Love, a 2004 television film alongside Michael Sheen, and Writers Retreat, released in 2015. In 2019 he portrayed Larry Murphy in the West End debut of the stage show Dear Evan Hansen at the Noël Coward Theatre. In 2020, Young was nominated for Laurence Olivier Award for Best Actor in a Supporting Role in a Musical for Dear Evan Hansen at the Laurence Olivier Awards.

Filmography

Television

Film

Theatre

References

External links
 

1978 births
Living people
English male television actors
English male film actors
Male actors from London
People from Lambeth